The Point San Luis Lighthouse, also known as the San Luis Obispo Light Station, is on the National Register of Historic Places. Located near Avila Beach on the Central Coast of California in San Luis Obispo County, it is the only Prairie Victorian model lighthouse left on the West Coast of the United States. It is being refurbished by the Point San Luis Lighthouse Keepers, a volunteer group.

History
The need for a lighthouse at Point San Luis was recognized as early as 1867. In that year, President Andrew Johnson directed by Executive Order the Department of the Interior to investigate the logistics of placing a lighthouse at that location. In the 1870s, Port Harford was quite busy, averaging 400 ships per year arriving at that location, and the need for a lighthouse was again discovered. In 1877, the Tribune of San Luis Obispo reported that Congressman Romualdo Pacheco had introduced a bill for the construction of a lighthouse at Point San Luis. This early effort was not successful, but in 1886 Congress finally passed the funding authorization for the lighthouse.

The construction of the lighthouse was delayed and it took the near disaster of a ship sinking to move the project ahead. On the night of April 29, 1888, a ship called the Queen of the Pacific began to take on water. The captain turned his ship to the harbor but had to proceed slowly because of the dark and for fear of the rocks at the harbor entrance. Since most of the ship was still above water, there were no lives lost. It was argued, however, that with a lighthouse to guide it, the ship would have easily made it to the pier. This provided the final impetus for the creation of the lighthouse.

The lighthouse was completed in June 1890, and was lit for the first time on June 30, 1890, with the steam powered fog whistle becoming operational in 1891. By specification, the 4th Order Fresnel lens would generate alternate red and white flashes of light every 30 seconds that would be visible  out to sea. In 1969, the Fresnel lens was retired (it is currently on display at the Point SLO Lighthouse) and replaced by an automated electric light. In 1974, the Coast Guard decommissioned the light station.

Access
In 1992, the Port San Luis Harbor District received the Point San Luis site from the Federal Government, with the understanding that the light station be a historical, educational, and recreational site, for the use and enjoyment of the public. In 1995, the Point San Luis Lighthouse Keepers non-profit corporation was created to manage that task. In early 2010 to mark the 120th anniversary of the lighthouse the Fresnel lens was returned to the station and placed on display. A van service was put in place for trips to the lighthouse. Point San Luis runs weekly van tours, a docent led hike via the Pecho Coast Trail, hosts weddings, and has ongoing special events for the public.

See also

 List of lighthouses in the United States

References

External links

 The Point San Luis Lighthouse website
 Memorandum of Understanding, Port San Luis Harbor District and Point San Luis Lighthouse Keepers, June 9, 2016
Inventory of Historic Lightstations

Historic districts on the National Register of Historic Places in California
Lighthouses completed in 1890
Lighthouses on the National Register of Historic Places in California
National Register of Historic Places in San Luis Obispo County, California
Buildings and structures in San Luis Obispo County, California
Tourist attractions in San Luis Obispo County, California